Jean André Wahl (25 May 188819 June 1974) was a French philosopher.

Early career
Wahl was educated at the École Normale Supérieure. He was a professor at the Sorbonne from 1936 to 1967, broken by World War II. He was in the U.S. from 1942 to 1945, having been interned as a Jew at the Drancy internment camp (north-east of Paris) and then escaped.

He began his career as a follower of Henri Bergson and the American pluralist philosophers William James and George Santayana. He is known as one of those introducing Hegelian thought in France in the 1930s (his book on Hegel was published in 1929), ahead of Alexandre Kojève's more celebrated lectures. He was also a champion in French thought of the Danish proto-existentialist Søren Kierkegaard. These enthusiasms, which became the significant books Le malheur de la conscience dans la Philosophie de Hegel (1929) and Études kierkegaardiennes (1938) were controversial, in the prevailing climate of thought. However, he influenced a number of key thinkers including Gilles Deleuze, Emmanuel Levinas and Jean-Paul Sartre. In the second issue of Acéphale, Georges Bataille's review, Jean Wahl wrote an article titled "Nietzsche and the Death of God", concerning Karl Jaspers' interpretation of this work. He became known as an anti-systematic philosopher, in favour of philosophical innovation and the concrete.

In exile
While in the USA, Wahl with Gustave Cohen and backed by the Rockefeller Foundation founded a 'university in exile', the École Libre des Hautes Études, in New York City. Later, at Mount Holyoke where he had a position, he set up the Décades de Mount Holyoke, also known as Pontigny-en-Amérique, modelled on meetings run from 1910-1939 by French philosopher Paul Desjardins (November 22, 1859 - March 13, 1940) at the site of the Cistercian abbey of Pontigny in Burgundy. These successfully gathered together French intellectuals in wartime exile, ostensibly studying the English language, with Americans including Marianne Moore, Wallace Stevens and Roger Sessions. Wahl, already a published poet, made translations of poems of Stevens into French. He was also an avid reader of the Four Quartets and toyed with the idea of publishing a poetical refutation of the poem. (See, e.g., his "On Reading the Four Quartets." )

Post World War II
In post-war France Wahl was an important figure, as a teacher and editor of learned journals. In 1946 he founded the Collège philosophique, influential center for non-conformist intellectuals, alternative to the Sorbonne. Starting in 1950, he headed the Revue de Métaphysique et de Morale.

Wahl translated the second hypothesis of the Parmenides of Plato as "Il y a de l'Un", and Jacques Lacan adopted his translation as a central point in psychoanalysis, as a sort of antecedent in the Parmenides of the analytic discourse. This is the existential sentence of psychoanalytic discourse according to Lacan, and the negative one is "Il n'y a pas de rapport sexuel " — there is no sexual relationship.

Works 
 Du rôle de l'idée de l'instant dans la Philosophie de Descartes, Paris, Alcan, 1920; rééd. avec une préface de Frédéric Worms, Paris, Descartes & Co, 1994.
 Les Philosophies pluralistes d'Angleterre et d'Amérique, Paris, Alcan, 1920; rééd. préface de Thibaud Trochu, Les Empêcheurs de penser en rond, 2005.
 Le Malheur de la conscience dans la Philosophie de Hegel, Paris, Rieder, 1929.
 Étude sur le Parménide de Platon, Paris, Rieder, 1930.
 Vers le concret, études d'histoire de la philosophie contemporaine (William James, Whitehead, Gabriel Marcel), Paris, Vrin, 1932; rééd. avec un avant-propos de Mathias Girel, Paris, Vrin, 2004.
 Études kierkegaardiennes, Paris, Aubier, 1938.
 Les Problèmes platoniciens : La République, Euthydème, Cratyle (Paris: CDU, 3 fasc., 1938-1939).
 Existence humaine et transcendance, Neufchâtel, La Baconnière, 1944.
 Tableau de la philosophie française, Paris, Fontaine, 1946.
 Introduction à la pensée de Heidegger, livre de poche, 1946.
 Petite histoire de l'existentialisme, Paris, L'Arche, 1947.
 Poésie, pensée, perception, Paris, Calman-Levy, 1948.
 Jules Lequier 1814-1862, Geneva, Éditions des Trois Collines, 1948.
 La Pensée de l'existence, Paris, Flammarion, 1952.
 Traité de Métaphysique, Paris, Payot, 1953.
 La structure du monde réel d'après Nicolai Hartmann (Paris: Centre de documentation universitaire, 1953) (Cours de la Sorbonne enseigné en 1952).
 La théorie des catégories fondamentales dans Nicolai Hartmann (Paris: Centre de documentation universitaire, 1954) (Cours de la Sorbonne enseigné en 1953).
 Les Philosophies de l'existence, Paris, Armand Colin, 1954.
 Les aspects qualitatifs du réel. I. Introduction, la philosophie de l'existence; II. Début d'une étude sur Husserl; III. La philosophie de la nature de N. Hartmann, Paris: Centre de documentation universitaire 1955. (Cours de la Sorbonne enseigné en 1954).
 Vers la fin de l'ontologie - Étude sur l'«Introduction de la Métaphysique» de Heidegger, Paris, SEDES, 1956.
 L'Expérience métaphysique, Paris, Flammarion, 1964.
 Cours sur l'athéisme éclairé de Dom Deschamps, 1967.

English translations
 The Philosophers Way Oxford University Press 1948
 The Pluralist Philosophies Of England And America, 1925 (mostly about William James)
 A Short History of Existentialism, 1949
 Transcendence and the Concrete: Selected Writings of Jean Wahl. Edited by Alan D. Schrift and Ian Alexander Moore. New York: Fordham University Press, 2016.
 Human Existence and Transcendence. Translated by William C. Hackett. Notre Dame, IN: University of Notre Dame Press, 2016.

Wahl in literature 
In 2021, Angelico Press published W.C. Hackett's novella Outside the Gates, based on the true story of Wahl's release from the Drancy Internment Camp. The narrator in the novella is Wahl himself, who alternatively tells what he is experiencing and muses philosophically on his situation in life, his sufferings and the sufferings of others in the war, and on whether or not there is a God. Hackett, himself a professional philosopher, artfully weaves in to the narrative former students and colleagues of Wahl.

See also
 Jean Hyppolite

References

Further reading
 Emmanuel Levinas, Paul Ricœur and Xavier Tilliette, Jean Wahl et Gabriel Marcel, Beauchesne, 1976, 96 p., 
 Bruce Baugh, French Hegel. From Surrealism to Postmodernism, New York/London, Routledge, 2003.
 Michel Weber, « Jean Wahl (1888–1974) », in Michel Weber and William Desmond, Jr. (eds.), Handbook of Whiteheadian Process Thought, Frankfurt / Lancaster, Ontos Verlag, Process Thought X1 & X2, 2008, I, pp. 15–38, 395-414, 573-599 ; II, pp. 640–642.

20th-century French Jews
Jewish philosophers
Mount Holyoke College faculty
Writers from Marseille
1888 births
1974 deaths
Heidegger scholars
Metaphysicians
Existentialists
Continental philosophers
20th-century French philosophers
French male writers